This article contains a list of corruption case in Ghana.

Cases 
 SSNIT software scandal
 NHIS scandal
 GYEEDA saga
 BOST contaminated fuel scandal
GFA 2018 scandal
Ghana Judiciary Scandal
Ghana EC Scandal
Tema Port Scandal
Stephen Opuni Cocoa Board Scandal

See also
2015 Ghana Judiciary scandal
 Corruption in Ghana

References 

Corruption in Ghana